Peter Dobing (born 1 December 1938) is an English former footballer who played in the Football League for Blackburn Rovers, Manchester City and Stoke City.

Career
Dobing was born in Manchester and came from a sporting family, his father playing rugby league for Salford. At first Dobing chose to play as an amateur footballer, which allowed him to play for more than one club. This backfired on him as he signed for both Manchester United and Blackburn Rovers and was selected by each club for the upcoming 'A' team game. Dobing resolved the situation by signing a professional contract with Blackburn in December 1955.

In 1957–58 he scored 20 League goals as Blackburn gained promotion to the First Division, including four in one match against Bristol City. The following season he scored 24 league goals, the highest figure of his career. In 1959–60 Dobing played a large part in Blackburn's FA Cup run which saw them reach the final, scoring five goals during the cup run. However, Rovers were soundly beaten 3–0 by Wolverhampton Wanderers in the final. In 1961 he moved to Manchester City for £37,500.

Manchester City signed Dobing as a replacement for Denis Law, who had departed for Italian side Torino. He made his Manchester City debut in the opening match of the 1961–62 season, a 3–1 win against Leicester City. He started all but one of Manchester City's matches that season, finishing the season as the club's top scorer with 22 goals. The following season was less successful, Dobing scored 10 goals in 50 appearances in a year which ended in relegation. In the close season Dobing was sold to newly promoted Stoke City.

Stoke manager Tony Waddington broke the club's record transfer fee paying Man City £37,500 for Dobing's services as Stoke looked to establish themselves back in the First Division. In Dobing's first season at Stoke he scored 19 goals as the club reached the final of the League Cup, but were beaten 4–3 on aggregate by Leicester City. He suffered a broken leg against West Bromwich Albion in January 1965 ending his season. During his recovery he spent time fishing for trout in Market Drayton and was a keen clay pigeon shooter. He was also a pipe smoker and became known as 'the pipe-smoking gentleman of English football'. However his relationship with the fans was not that good as after his recovery he refused to resign for the 1965–66 wanting a pay increase, and finally accepted Stoke's offer three weeks later. He won the fans over with a brilliant individual performance against Leeds United in April 1968 scoring a hat trick against England international defender Jack Charlton. With the 1960s coming to an end Waddington decided to move the ageing Dobing into a midfield position alongside George Eastham and this duo's passing ability improved Stoke's attacking play as the side went on to win their first major trophy, the League Cup in 1972. Dobing captained the side as Stoke beat Chelsea 2–1.

Dobing was known for his short temper on the pitch, which once resulted in his receiving a nine-week suspension. His playing career ended due to a broken leg sustained in 1973. He then worked in the Staffordshire pottery industry.

Career statistics
Source:

Honours
 Blackburn Rovers
 Football League Second Division runners-up: 1957–58
 FA Cup runner-up: 1960

 Stoke City
 Football League Cup winner: 1972
 Football League Cup runner-up: 1964

References

External links
 USA stats at NASL Jerseys

1938 births
Living people
English footballers
England under-23 international footballers
Blackburn Rovers F.C. players
Manchester City F.C. players
Stoke City F.C. players
English Football League players
Association football inside forwards
English Football League representative players
Footballers from Manchester
Cleveland Stokers players
United Soccer Association players
English expatriate sportspeople in the United States
Expatriate soccer players in the United States
English expatriate footballers
FA Cup Final players